The Controlled Drugs (Penalties) Act 1985 is an Act of the Parliament of the United Kingdom. It amended the Misuse of Drugs Act 1971 and the Customs and Excise Management Act 1979 to increase the maximum penalty for importing, producing or supplying Class A drugs, or possessing them with intent to supply, from 14 years to life imprisonment.

United Kingdom Acts of Parliament 1971
Drug control law in the United Kingdom
English criminal law
Misuse of Drugs Act 1971